The Alexandra Gardens are located on the south bank of the Yarra River, opposite Federation Square and the Melbourne Central Business District, in Victoria, Australia. The Gardens are bounded by the Yarra River to the north, Princes and Swan street bridges, with Queen Victoria Gardens and Kings Domain across Alexandra Avenue to the south. The gardens are part of the Domain parklands which stretch to the Royal Botanic Gardens and were first laid out in 1901, under the direction of Carlo Catani, Chief Engineer of the Public Works Department. The Alexandra Gardens were named in honor of Alexandra of Denmark, in the year her reign as Queen Consort of the United Kingdom and the British Dominions and Empress consort of India began. The Alexandra Gardens are listed on the Victorian Heritage Register due to their historical and archaeological significance.

Domain Parklands 
Alexandra Gardens are part of a larger group of parklands directly south-east of the city, between St. Kilda Road and the Yarra River known as the Domain Parklands, which includes;
 The Royal Botanic Gardens
 Kings Domain
 Alexandra Gardens
 Queen Victoria Gardens

History 
From the time of European settlement of Melbourne in 1835, the area of the gardens was used for timber cutting, cattle grazing and as a brickmakers' field. Regular flooding occurred until a new channel for the Yarra River was dug from 1896 to 1900 to straighten and widen the river. The spoil was used to fill the swampy lagoons and brickmakers pits and raise the height of the river bank where Alexandra Gardens now stands. Landscaping occurred immediately, and the gardens were planned and laid out for the visit of the Duke of York in May 1901.

Cycling and skating 

Pedestrian and cycle access to the gardens is via steps or a ramp from Princes Bridge, or along the promenade from Southbank under Princes Bridge. Vehicular access is provided by Boathouse Drive from Alexandra Avenue. Next to Princes Bridge bicycles are available for hire to explore the Capital City Trail along the river. Also the prominent, The Around the Bay in a Day cycling event has its finish line at the Gardens.

A skate park opened in 2001 in the gardens, with a café and first aid station, close to some distinctive Canary Island Palms which were planted in 1911.

Rowing 
Alongside the Yarra River numerous rowing club boathouses nestle in the gardens, including the Mercantile Rowing Club. The Olympic champions, the Oarsome Foursome, were known to train along the Yarra river.

The annual Henley-on-Yarra regatta was held from 1904, every spring just before Melbourne Cup day. For a day and a night, Melburnians flocked to the Yarra to watch this sporting event, with attendances peaking at 300,000 in 1925. After World War II, the event declined in significance, however the annual Australian Henley Rowing Regatta still occurs as an amateur event in December, with recent attempts to increase its popularity.

Past the boathouses are lawns with electric barbecues, which are popular spots for picnics and office parties around Christmas time. As well as lawns fronting the Yarra river, the gardens contain a star-shaped garden bed representing the Federation of Australia; many mature trees including elms and an avenue of planes and oak trees along Boathouse Drive; ornamental flower beds.

References

External links 
 Melbourne City Council – Alexandra Gardens
 Australian Henley Rowing Regatta

Heritage sites in Melbourne
Parks in Melbourne
Gardens in Victoria (Australia)
1901 establishments in Australia
Landmarks in Melbourne
City of Melbourne